Kabhi Khushi Kabhie Gham... (Sometimes Happiness, Sometimes Sadness), also known by the initialism K3G, is a 2001 Indian Hindi-language family melodrama film written and directed by Karan Johar and produced by Yash Johar. The film has an ensemble cast, starring Amitabh Bachchan, Jaya Bachchan, Shah Rukh Khan, Kajol, Hrithik Roshan, Kareena Kapoor and Rani Mukerji. It tells the story of an Indian family, which faces troubles and misunderstandings over their adopted son's marriage to a girl belonging to a lower socio-economic group than them. The film score was composed by Babloo Chakravarty with songs by Jatin–Lalit, Sandesh Shandilya and Aadesh Shrivastava and lyrics written by Sameer and Anil Pandey.

Development of the film began in 1998, soon after the release of Johar's debut film Kuch Kuch Hota Hai (1998). Principal photography began on 16 October 2000 in Mumbai and continued in London and Egypt. Kabhi Khushi Kabhie Gham... was promoted with the tag-line "It's All About Loving Your Parents". Initially scheduled for the Diwali festivities of 2001, the film was eventually released in India, the United Kingdom and North America on 14 December 2001.

It received mixed reviews from critics who praised the cinematography, costume design, soundtrack, performances, emotional sequences and themes, but criticized the length and the script. Outside India, the film was the highest-grossing Indian film ever, until its record was broken by Johar's next directorial Kabhi Alvida Naa Kehna (2006). Kabhi Khushi Kabhie Gham... won several awards at popular award ceremonies the following year, including five Filmfare Awards.

Plot
Yashvardhan "Yash" Raichand is a business tycoon. He lives in Delhi with his wife Nandini, his two sons Rahul and Rohan as well as his mother, Lajwanti and mother-in-law, Rajinder. Their household is highly patriarchal and strictly follows traditions. Rahul was adopted by Yash and Nandini at birth. This is known to everyone in the household except Rohan.

Adult Rahul returns home after completing his studies in London, and falls in love with the vivacious Anjali from Chandni Chowk. Rahul learns shortly that she reciprocates his love. However, since she is from a low-income background, his father would never approve of the match. During this time Rohan, still a child, is sent to boarding school as per a family tradition. Yash announces his desire for Rahul to marry Naina, Rahul's higher-class childhood friend.

After knowing of Anjali, Yash is enraged due to her status. Rahul promises not to marry her. However, he learns Anjali and her kid sister Pooja's father Om has died, leaving them behind. He spontaneously marries her despite Yash's hostility. When he brings her home, Yash disowns Rahul reminding him of his adopted status. Hurt by this, Rahul bids a tearful goodbye with Nandini and leaves home. Rohan never finds out the truth of why Rahul left home.

10 years later, Rohan returns home from boarding school; he finally learns from his grandmothers, Lajjo and Rajinder, why Rahul left and the fact that he is adopted. Seeing the pain that this separation has brought upon his parents, Rohan vows to reunite the family. He learns that Rahul, Anjali, and Pooja have moved to London; he travels there, lying to Yash and Nandini to pursue further studies. Rahul and Anjali have a young son, Krish.

Pooja is an ultra-modern diva studying at King's College London. She and Rohan, who were childhood friends in the past after Rahul and Anjali fell in love, reunite. She supports him in his quest to bring Rahul and Anjali back home. Rohan poses as Pooja's friend from India. Rahul lets him live with them after Rohan introduces himself as "Yash" to hide the truth: Rahul doesn't recognise his immensely-changed now-adult brother seeing him after so many years.

Meanwhile, Rohan and Pooja grow closer and develop feelings for one another. Eventually, Rahul finally realises that Rohan aka "Yash" is his brother. Rohan begs him to come home but he refuses, reminding him of what Yash said. Rohan invites Yash and Nandini to London and arranges a covert reunion to bring them all to the same mall. Nandini and Rahul have an emotional reunion. However Yash is enraged at Rohan when he sees Rahul, Anjali and Pooja with him and their confrontation does not go well.

Nandini stands up to Yash for the first time, telling him he did wrong by disowning Rahul and breaking the family. After their grandmother's death, Rohan and Pooja convince Rahul and Anjali to come home. Nandini gives them a proper welcome; When Rahul goes up to Yash, Yash admits his wrongdoing of disowning Rahul and tearfully asks for forgiveness, telling Rahul that he had always loved him. Rahul forgives Yash, who subsequently apologizes to Anjali for not approving their marriage at the time. Rohan and Pooja who had fallen in love, later get married. The family holds a belated celebration of Rahul and Anjali's wedding—thus living happily together and also Rohan and Pooja's wedding.

Cast

Main
 Amitabh Bachchan as Yashvardhan "Yash" Raichand: Lajjo's son, Rajinder's son-in-law, Nandini's husband, Rahul's adoptive father and Rohan's father. A Delhi-based business tycoon. Fiercely dominating, he insists on controlling the life of his wife and sons. Bachchan was Johar's first choice for the portrayal of Yash. Johar added, "As I wrote the film, I realised that Yash is the backbone of the film and I could only see one actor playing the role – Amitabh Bachchan." Bachchan, on his part, agreed to do the film without a script narration. Johar mentioned that he was initially scared to direct a star of the stature of Bachchan, but the latter "soon became an actor instead of a superstar."
 Jaya Bachchan as Nandini Chandran Raichand: Rajinder's daughter, Lajjo's daughter-in-law, Yash's wife, Rahul's adoptive mother and Rohan's mother (She shares a close bond with her sons but remains in the shadow of her husband. According to Johar, she was the "obvious" choice for the character of Nandini, and added that her "acting prowess and stature" were the other reasons for him preferring to cast her.) The film also marked the return of Amitabh and Jaya together on screen after a gap of 18 years. Of her character, she said that Nandini was an extension of her own self. She elaborated, "My personal feelings towards Shahrukh are similar to what I was supposed to portray in the film. There's something about him that makes me want to mother him." She added that she modelled her character on Johar's mother, Hiroo, who "is a very emotional and sentimental person."
 Shah Rukh Khan as Rahul Yashvardhan Raichand: Yash and Nandini's adopted son, Rohan's adopted elder brother, Anjali's husband and Krish's father. He feels indebted to Yash and Nandini and tries to fulfill all their wishes. However, he invites Yash's wrath by falling in love with and marrying Anjali. When Johar offered the role to Khan, he immediately agreed to do it and accommodated his dates, despite having several other commitments. Khan described the character of Rahul by saying, "I love the vulnerability and the honesty in his eyes. He has the appeal of a boy next door. Besides, his intensity and ability to convey emotions without words is amazing."
 Aryan Khan as young Rahul Raichand
 Kajol as Anjali Sharma Raichand: Om's daughter, Pooja's elder sister, Rahul's wife and Krish's mother. She is a fun-loving woman living in the Chandni Chowk area of Delhi. Belonging to a lower socio-economic group than the Raichand family, she is not accepted by Yash as his daughter-in-law. Karan Johar was initially hesitant to cast Kajol in the film, as he felt that she would refuse the offer. Had Kajol declined, Johar announced in his book An Unsuitable Boy that he was planning to offer the role to Aishwarya Rai Bachchan whom he had narrated the film to. Kajol however, was moved to tears during the script narration and agreed to do the film. In an interview to Filmfare, Kajol said, "One tiny fact that Johar forgot to mention during his narration was just how much Punjabi my character spoke in the film. I nearly died when I saw the lines of dialogue on the first day of shooting." However, she learnt the right pronunciation and diction with the help of Yash Johar and the crew members.
 Hrithik Roshan as Rohan Yashvardhan Raichand: Yash and Nandini's biological son, Rahul's adoptive younger brother and Pooja's husband. Unaware in his childhood about Rahul being adopted, his mission is to make him return home even after learning the truth from his grandmothers. Johar signed Roshan to play the character of Rohan after watching a rough cut of his debut film, Kaho Naa... Pyaar Hai (2000). Roshan described his character as a "buffer" in a film that primarily focused on Bachchan and Shahrukh.
 Kavish Majumdar as young Rohan "Laddoo" Raichand
 Kareena Kapoor Khan as Pooja "Poo" Sharma Raichand: Om's daughter; Anjali's younger sister and Rohan's wife. She is a sophisticated girl, who helps Rohan in his plan to bring Rahul back to his home; in the process they fall in love. After spotting Kapoor at a party organised by Bombay Times, Johar decided to cast her immediately for the role of the glamorous diva, Poo. Kapoor stated that in her opinion, Kabhi Khushi Kabhie Gham... was primarily Kajol's film, and that her own character was a supporting one. In order to prepare for her role, she worked hard on her dancing skills, as she did not want audiences to know that she could not dance well.
 Malvika Raaj as young Pooja "Poo" Sharma
 Rani Mukerji as Naina Kapoor: Ashish's daughter and Rahul's family friend (A socialite girl who loves and wants to marry Rahul, and Yash approves of her.) Following the success of Johar's previous & debut film, Kuch Kuch Hota Hai (1998) which starred Khan, Kajol and Mukerji, he wanted her presence in this film too. He thus cast Mukerji in a guest appearance. Initially, Johar wanted her presence in the film to be a surprise, but an accidental slip by Sony Music during the promotional activities led to her discovery.

Supporting
 Farida Jalal as Sayeeda Naaz / Daijan (DJ): Rahul and Rohan's nanny and Rukhsar's mother
 Jibraan Khan as Krish Raichand: Rahul and Anjali's son
 Simone Singh as Rukhsaar Naaz Siddiqui: Sayeeda's daughter, Anjali's best friend and Ashfaque's wife
 Alok Nath as Omendra "Om" Sharma: Anjali and Pooja's father
 Jugal Hansraj as Mohit Sachdev: Rohan's friend (special appearance)
 Achala Sachdev as Lajwanti "Lajjo" Raichand: Yash's mother and Nandini's mother-in-law; Rahul's adoptive paternal grandmother; Rohan's paternal grandmother
 Sushma Seth as Rajinder Kaur Chandran: Nandini's mother and Yash's mother-in-law; Rahul's adoptive maternal grandmother; Rohan's maternal grandmother
 Johnny Lever as Haldiram Rawat: Saraswati's husband and Ghasitaram's father (He is a shopkeeper in Chandni Chowk)
 Himani Shivpuri as Saraswati Rawat: Haldiram's wife and Ghasitaram's mother
 Amar Talwar as Ashish Kapoor: Yash's friend and Naina's father
 Ramona Sunavala as Sonia (Poo's friend 1)
 Jeroo Writer as Tanya (Poo's friend 2)
 Vikas Sethi as Randhir / Robbie (Poo's friend 3)
 Ashutosh Singh as Ashfaque Siddiqui, Zahida's son and Rukhsar's husband 
 Shilpa Mehta as Zahida Siddiqui, Ashfaque's mother
 Shashikala as Sahira Siddiqui, Ashfaque's grandmother
 Parzan Dastur as Osman Siddiqui, Ashfaque's nephew
 Punit Malhotra as a cricket bowler 
 Jessy Lever as Ghasitaram Rawat, Haldiram and Saraswati's son

Production

Development

After the success of Karan's directorial debut, Kuch Kuch Hota Hai (1998), he began work on a story dealing with the concept of "generations". The idea initially revolved around two daughters-in-law. However, on the advice of his cousin, filmmaker Aditya Chopra, who thought that the male characters would be too weak, Karan decided to tweak the story-line to make it the story of two brothers.

The inspiration behind Kabhi Khushi Kabhie Gham... came from Yash Chopra's Kabhi Kabhie (1976). On being inspired by the classic, Karan quoted, "What appealed to me was the fact that the love story stretched out across generations. It began with youth and went on as the people grew older. You could say that Kabhi Kabhie is the starting point for my new film, that I am inspired by it. But the film, I am sure, will be very different. It will look different, feel different." Similarly, Karan added an extra "e" to the second Kabhi in the title of his film, due to numerological reasons. In an interview with The Times of India, Karan dispelled comparisons with Kuch Kuch Hota Hai and said that while his debut film was "frothy and bubble-gummish", this one was "more classy and sophisticated". He added that there would be "plenty of drama" in this film too, but handled more maturely.

Before principal photography could begin, Karan and the contracted costume designers (Manish Malhotra, Shabina Khan and Rocky S) shopped in several locations of the US, London, Milan, and New Delhi to get the right look for each of the cast members. Additionally, Karan had only one expectation from the contracted actors; to "look good and do their job". He did not organise any rehearsals for them, except for a scene involving a climatic encounter between Amitabh Bachchan and Roshan. Additional production people hired included choreographer Farah Khan, production designer Sharmishta Roy and cinematographer Kiran Deohans.

Filming

The first schedule of the film began in Mumbai on 16 October 2000, with the picturisation of the song "Bole Chudiyan" involving Roshan, Kapoor, Khan and Kajol. Amitabh and Jaya Bachchan joined the schedule on 20 October. Due to the immense stress caused by the presence of these actors, Karan fainted on the sets. However, he continued directing the rest of the song while lying in bed. For the first half of Kabhi Khushi Kabhie Gham..., the production design team led by Sharmishtha Roy, recreated Chandni Chowk in a studio at Film City of Mumbai. In order to lend authenticity, the team took several pictures of the original area and also shopped in the various alleys of Chandni Chowk. Roy later won the Filmfare Award for Best Art Direction for her work in the film. The inside of a palatial mansion was developed from scratch in the same studio to double as the home of the Raichand family. In order to lend authenticity to the house of the multi-multimillionaires, several expensive paintings were hung from the walls. A total of 18–19 elaborate sets were constructed by Roy, as Karan wanted the look of the film to be "larger-than-life".

The second half of the film was shot in the city of London. Karan chose to set the film there due to his fondness for the city. He added, "I could have based my plot in New York City or anywhere else. But London is kind of close to my heart. I like to weave my films around London." Shooting locations include the Millennium Stadium, Bluewater in Kent, Blenheim Palace, St Paul's Cathedral and the banks of River Thames. The outdoor scenes of the Raichand family mansion were shot at Waddesdon Manor. The crew faced enormous difficulties while filming an emotional scene between Jaya Bachchan and Khan at the Bluewater Complex, as a massive crowd had gathered there to watch them at work. The situation, eventually, got worse and the complex officials asked them to wrap up the shoot within two hours. Another song sequence ("Suraj Hua Maddham") involving Khan and Kajol was shot with the backdrop of the Pyramids of Giza in the city of Cairo in Egypt. Due to the lighting conditions, the crew could shoot only between 7 and 9 am. As a result, the song took several days to film. In addition, Kajol suffered from a minor injury while filming for the song, as she had experienced a bad fall.

British journalist, Fuad Omar, wrote extensively about the filming of the film in the United Kingdom, covering much of the shoot in a series of online articles and for regional press. Many of these were reprinted in an unedited format in his book, Bollywood: An Insider's Guide.

Themes
Film critics and academics have analysed Kabhi Khushi Kabhie Gham... in several ways. In the book, Encyclopedia of Religion and Film, Eric Mazur described several "mythological subtexts" in the film. While mentioning the opening scene of the film, which features the Raichand family worshiping "Hindu deities during the annual Diwali holiday", he explained that the scene allowed the Hindu audiences to participate in the darshan along with the characters.

Author Rajani Mazumdar compared Kabhi Khushi Kabhie Gham... to Hum Aapke Hain Koun..! (1994) and added that the film dealt with themes of family and moral values through a "spectacular stage that moves across global locations". She further stated that the buildup to the story was juxtaposed with the backdrop of two contrasting places – the Raichand home and the interiors of Chandni Chowk. While the Raichand house is described as "expensive, almost like a museum", Chandni Chowk is shown as a world of crowds, chaos and festivities. She also made a note of the use of frontal camera angles in order to ensure that the "spectators eye travels throughout the interior expanse".

Writer Sangita Gopal analysed the "intensification of the aesthetic effects of Hindi cinema" in the narrative scheme of the film. During the confrontation scene between Yash and Rahul Raichand, a "thundering background score" coupled with "360° panning shots" were used to build up melodrama. She added that while such scenes simply began by reprising previous face-offs in several melodramatic Hindi films (such as Mohabbatein (2000)), they gradually shifted "to a more realist register as the framework moves from a sociology to a psychology of the family". Mazur mentioned the use of "dream sequences" in the film as a means of escapism. He referred to the song "Suraj Hua Maddham" as an extradiegetic sequence that allowed Rahul and Anjali to be physically intimate "in ways that they could not in the real world of the film." He added that the characters conveyed a plethora of emotions not through extensive dialogue but through the exchange of glances, which were demonstrated by extreme close-ups on their eyes.

Writing for the book Movie Blockbusters, Andrew Willis commented that the film was specifically written to appeal to the Indian diaspora. He explained that the film was aimed at invoking nostalgia among the large section of NRI's in Canada, United Kingdom and North America. In the second half of the film, Rahul and Anjali move to London, where they enjoy an affluent lifestyle, among several non-Indian neighbours and friends. However, there is a perpetual dissatisfaction among them, especially Anjali, in living away from home. Additionally, she dresses up in a traditional sari and performs the duties of a loyal housemaker. She also frets about her son and younger sister being "too influenced" by Western culture. The film, thus tries to form an emotional connection with the expatriate Indian audiences.

According to Eckstein, several sequences convey a "culturally conservative" and "idealistic image" of India, while maintaining that the diaspora living in Britain lead a life of "involuntary exile". Western ideology is equated with economic success, with emphasis on Western consumerism such as Starbucks and Burger King. Creekmur believes that Rohan was the only character in the film who could navigate multiple cultural spaces with ease. He seems totally at ease both at his ancestral home in India and in London. Though the tag-line for the film was "It's all about loving your parents", Creekmur was skeptical and suggested "the film seems to actually admonish stern fathers to trust and love their children – mothers, aunties, and grandmothers, of course, love their children unconditionally even while respecting the idiotic wishes of vain patriarchs."

Music

The music of the film was composed by Jatin–Lalit, Sandesh Shandilya and Aadesh Shrivastava. The lyrics were provided by Sameer, except for "Suraj Hua Maddham" which was penned by Anil Pandey. A total of 11 tracks are present in the album, which was released by Sony Music on 26 October 2001. Explaining the album, Karan Johar said, "I wanted music that had all kinds of tunes — pop, romantic, bhangra – but one sound. It had to be larger than life." He added that Jatin-Lalit came up with three "haunting melodies", while Shandilya and Shrivastava came up with the pop and bhangra songs, respectively. A legal suit was filed against Johar for using the song "It's Raining Men" in the film without obtaining prior permission.

Upon release, the soundtrack of Kabhi Khushi Kabhie Gham... emerged as a major success by selling 2.5 million units within 30 days. It became the best-selling album of the year in India, with 3.5million soundtrack album sales. Writing for Rediff, Sukanya Varma praised most of the compositions, while being critical of the song "Say Shava Shava" due to the "overdose of Punjabi emotions". She summed up by saying, "The music of K3G has a presence. Hate it or love it, you certainly won't ignore it." Planet Bollywood gave it 8 of 10 stars, calling "Suraj Hua Maddham" by Sonu Nigam and Alka Yagnik the best song, and the best reason to buy the album.

In 2002, Sony released another album titled Klub K3G, featuring remixes by Indian electronic music producers Akshai Sarin, Harshdeep Sidhu, Prempal Hans and others.

Release
Initially scheduled for a theatrical release during the Diwali celebrations of 2001, Kabhi Khushi Kabhie Gham... released a month later on 14 December 2001. Due to the long duration of the film, theatres screened three shows daily, instead of four. Additionally, due to a massive rush in advance bookings, several theatres increased their ticket prices.

The use of "Jana Gana Mana" by Rabindranath Tagore during the film was met with criticism from a certain section of the audiences, and politicians of the Bharatiya Janata Party, for being "out-of-context" and "insulting the national pride". Subsequently, a writ was issued against Dharma Productions in the Allahabad High Court by a petitioner based in Uttar Pradesh. However, the court did not entertain the complainant's petition.

Reception

Critical reception

India

In India, Kabhi Khushi Kabhie Gham... met with mixed reviews from critics. It received praise for its visual richness and the performances of the cast, but criticism towards the lengthy run time, the script strength and inconsistencies. Khalid Mohamed of The Times of India applauded the film in a five-star review: "K3G is the complete commercial banquet delivered with fabulous finesse by Karan Johar. So, go indulge yourself. Cry your heart out and surprisingly, you'll feel life's finally alive and kicking in Mumbai's dream world." Taran Adarsh of Bollywood Hungama gave the film 4.5 out of 5 stars. He praised the emotional sequences, as well as the choreography, production design, costumes, and cinematography. He added that Karan Johar was the real star, for creating many memorable sequences. Rakesh Budhu of Planet Bollywood gave the film 8 out of 10 stars, saying "Dharma Productions has kept its promise in giving us a lovable film to remember in coming times." He pointed out several flaws in the script, but added that the positive aspects of the film managed to outweigh the negative ones. He quoted, "K3G is one heck of an entertainer and was worth the wait". In the film review section of his book Bollywood: An Insider's Guide, Fuad Omar showered overwhelming praise on the film and called it a "masterpiece from the first frame to the last". In summary he said, "Overall Kabhi Khushi Kabhie Gham... is without a doubt the most enthralling, entertaining, emotional and complete vision and definition of Hindi cinema I have ever seen. It is simply the perfect Hindi film."

Contrary to the positive reviews, Anjum N., writing for Rediff, said that despite an extraordinary cast and a big budget, "Karan Johar disappoints." He praised Amitabh and Jaya Bachchan's performance and noted Roshan for holding his own against the veteran actors. However, in summary he called the film "a bad remix of Mohabbatein and Kuch Kuch Hota Hai". Writing for The Hindu, Ziya Us Salam praised Kajol's performance and Karan's ability to "keep the viewer occupied". She commented, "Watch Kabhi Khushi Kabhie Gham... not because of the hype which preceded its release but because in these meagre times not many have come up with better fare. The film at least partially redeems the hope surrounding it. Again, just like its name. Some joy, some disappointment." Namrata Joshi of Outlook gave a mixed review and said that while the film "makes you laugh and cry alternately", the shenanigans were nevertheless "fake and affected" and "monochromatic despite the profusion of colours".

Overseas
The reviews were mostly mixed outside of India too, with several critics praising the technical production details of the film, while being somewhat less enthusiastic about the story line. Shamaila Khan of BBC gave the film 9 out of 10 stars and praised the performances of Khan, Kajol and Kapoor. She summed up by saying, "(K3G is) a well made film, with some magical moments (hilarious and weepy) and possibly the world's best looking family!"
Derek Elley of Variety said that it "is a highly enjoyable, often dazzlingly staged vehicle dragged down by a sluggish final half-hour". He also praised the cinematography, and the picturisation of the song, "Say Shava Shava".

Box office
Upon release, Kabhi Khushi Kabhie Gham... broke all opening records. The domestic opening week collections were 70% higher than the previous record and never before had opening records been eclipsed by such large margins. It also set new records for the second and third weeks, by collecting  and  respectively. The film went on to become the second highest grosser of 2001 domestically, netting  in India, and earning "Blockbuster" status.

The film was released in around 125 prints in the overseas markets, grossing a total of $8.9 million at the end of its theatrical run. It performed very well in the United Kingdom, with a gross of $689,000 in its opening weekend. It thus debuted at the third position at the British box-office. The total earnings of the film reached over $3.2 million in the UK. The film also had the biggest opening ever for a Bollywood film in North America, with a gross of $1.1 million in 73 screens. However, according to a report by Rediff, the numbers were so high that the official reporting agency did not believe it, and asked for evidence that could not be furnished until after the reporting deadline had passed. If reported on time, the film would have opened at the number 10 spot in the North American box-office. However, according to figures from Box Office Mojo, the film debuted at the 32nd place at the American box office during the week of 4 January 2002. It eventually gathered a total of $2.9 million there. Additionally, in 2003, the film became the first from India to be given a theatrical release in Germany.

It was the highest-grossing film of the year in the overseas market, surpassing Gadar: Ek Prem Katha, which was the top grosser of the year. Its record of being the highest grosser in the overseas was broken only by Johar's next directorial, Kabhi Alvida Naa Kehna (2006). When adjusted for inflation, the film is still among the highest grossers worldwide.

Awards and nominations
Kabhi Khushi Kabhie Gham... received a leading 16 nominations at the 47th Filmfare Awards, ultimately winning five awards. In an interview with Filmfare, Karan Johar said that he was not dejected to have not won many awards at the ceremony, as he felt that Lagaan was "a classic" and deserved to win.

The film won several awards at the International Indian Film Academy Awards (IIFA), and some at the Zee Cine Awards and Screen Awards ceremonies, among others. At the 13th annual Valenciennes International Film Festival, the film won five major awards, including three Best Film awards and Best Actress for Kajol.

Other media
This reportedly includes  for the overseas rights sold to Sony.

During the production and filming process, a book entitled The Making of Kabhi Khushi Kabhie Gham... was written by Niranjan Iyengar. It features materials and interviews concerning the producer, director, cinematographer, art director, cast and crew that Iyengar gathered over an 18-month period during the production of the film. The book was released a few days prior to the theatrical release of the film.

Kabhi Khushi Kabhie Gham... has been released on VHS and DVD (one and two disc version) formats, beginning in 2002, and in the Blu-ray format beginning in 2010. The two disc DVD version of the film contains a 45-minute documentary entitled The Making of Kabhi Khushi Kabhie Gham... along with deleted scenes, a theatrical trailer, and several television promos.

References

Bibliography 

 .
 .
 .
 .
 .
 .
 .
 
 .

Further reading

External links

 
 
 
 
 
 
 Kabhi Khushi Kabhie Gham... at Rediff
 Kabhi Khushi Kabhie Gham... at Yash Raj Films
 
 

2001 films
2000s Hindi-language films
Films directed by Karan Johar
Films set in Delhi
Films set in London
Films shot in Mumbai
Films shot in Delhi
Films shot in England
Films scored by Aadesh Shrivastava
Films scored by Jatin–Lalit
Films scored by Sandesh Shandilya
Films about mother–son relationships
Indian romantic musical films
Films distributed by Yash Raj Films
Films shot in Egypt
Films shot in Buckinghamshire
Films shot in Cardiff
Films shot in Wales
Films shot in London
Films shot in the United Kingdom